The following is a timeline of the history of the city of Bulawayo, Zimbabwe.

19th century

 1830s - Ndebele Mzilikazi Khumalo locates seat of Mthwakazi nation in Bulawayo, in Matabeleland (approximate date).
 1893 - Ndebele capital "GuBulawayo" besieged, demolished by British South Africa Company forces during the First Matabele War.
 1894
 Bulawayo town established near former settlement by British South Africa Company.
 Telegraph begins operating.
 Chronicle newspaper begins publication.
 1896/97 - Siege of Bulawayo during the Second Matabele War
 1897
 Bulawayo becomes a municipality.
 State House, Bulawayo completed as "Government House".
 I.G. Hirschler becomes mayor.
 Railway to South Africa begins operating.
 1899 - Railway to Salisbury and Mozambique begins operating.
 1900 - Beira–Bulawayo railway opened.

20th century
 1902 - Cecil Rhodes was buried at the Matoppo Hills at Malindidzimu
 1904
 Statue of Cecil Rhodes erected. 
  "White" population: 3,840.
 1905 - Railway to Victoria Falls and Zambia begins operating.
 1919 - James Cowden becomes mayor.
 1926 - Rhodes Matopos National Park established near Bulawayo.
 1927 - Bulawayo Technical School established.
 1931 - Catholic Mission of Bulawayo established.
 1934 - Bulawayo Club building constructed.
 1943 - Bulawayo attains city status.
 1950 - Rainbow Hotel built.
 1957 - Bulawayo Thermal Power Station (coal-fired thermal power plant) opens.
 1960 - Trade fair begins.
 1964 - Natural History Museum of Zimbabwe opens.
 1970 - National Gallery of Zimbabwe branch opens.
 1972 - Bulawayo Railway Museum opens.
 1973 - Population: 307,000 (estimate).
 1981 - February: 1981 Entumbane uprising.
 1983 - Population: 429,000 (estimate).
 1985 - National Railways of Zimbabwe headquarters building constructed.
 1991 - National University of Science and Technology established.
 1992 - Population: 621,742.
 1999 - Beitbridge Bulawayo Railway (Beitbridge-Bulawayo) begins operating.
 2000 - June: Political activist Patrick Nabanyama of the Movement for Democratic Change kidnapped.

21st century
 2001
 August: Municipal election postponed by Mugabe administration.
 November: Political unrest.
 Japhet Ndabeni Ncube becomes mayor.
 2008 - Patrick Thaba-Moyo becomes mayor.
 2012 - Population: 653,337.
 2013
 Joshua Nkomo statue erected.
 Martin Moyo becomes mayor.
 Joshua Mqabuko Nkomo International Airport new terminal opens.

See also
 Bulawayo history
 List of mayors of Bulawayo
 Timeline of Harare

References

This article incorporates information from the German Wikipedia.

Bibliography

  (Includes description of Bulawayo)
 
 
 
 
  Miriam R. Grant. Difficult Debut: Social and Economic Identities of Urban Youth in Bulawayo, Zimbabwe. Canadian Journal of African Studies, Vol. 37, No. 2/3, 2003.
 
 
   (Includes information about Bulawayo)

External links

  (Bibliography)
 Items related to Bulawayo, various dates (via Europeana)
 Items related to Bulawayo, various dates (via Digital Public Library of America)

Images

Bulawayo
Bulawayo
History of Zimbabwe
Timeline
Years in Zimbabwe